Drillia acapulcana is a species of sea snail, a marine gastropod mollusk in the family Drilliidae.

Originally named  Elaeocyma acapulcana by H.N. Lowe in 1935, it was renamed Drillia acapulcana by Mclean in 1971.

Description
The length of the shell attains 23 mm, its diameter 10 mm.

Distribution
This species occurs in the demersal zone of the Eastern Pacific off Mexico.

References

 
 Tucker, J.K. 2004 Catalog of recent and fossil turrids (Mollusca: Gastropoda). Zootaxa 682:1–1295

External links
 

acapulcana
Gastropods described in 1935